Randi Thorvaldsen (4 March 1925, in Øvre Eiker – 10 February 2011) was a Norwegian speedskater, silver medalist from the allround World Championship, and a previous World Record holder in 1,500 metres. She was the dominating female speedskater in Norway from the end of the Second World War to 1954. She was born in Fiskum, Øvre Eiker, and represented the club IF Liv, Hønefoss.

National merits
Thorvaldsen won the first national all-round speed skating championship held in Norway after World War II, in 1946. She became Norwegian all-round champion nine years in a row, every year from 1946 to 1954. In these championships she won 34 distances, out of 36 possible. She set ten national records during her career. Her national record on 5,000 m from 1953, 9:35.6, was unbeaten for 29 years, until 1982.

World championships
Thorvaldsen participated in eight World Championships. She placed fourth in 1948, and again fourth in 1949, and ninth in 1950. She won a silver medal at the World Allround Speed Skating Championships for Women in 1951 in Eskilstuna, behind Eevi Huttunen. At the 1951 championship she won the 500 m distance with the time 49.4, placed second at 1,000 m (1:42.6), second on 3,000 m (5:56.0) and second on 5,000 m (9:54.8), resulting in the samalog (total score) 219.513. At the World Championships in 1952 in Kokkola she won the bronze medal, after placing second on 500 m and 1,500 m, fifth on 3,000 m and sixth on 5,000 m. At the 1953 World Championships she finished sixth, and again sixth in 1954.

Records
Thorvaldsen set a world record in women's 1500 m in Gjøvik in 1950, when she improved Laila Schou Nilsen's previous record from 1937. Her new record, 2:37.5, lasted less than one month, when it was beaten by Rimma Zhukova.

References
Notes

Bibliography

 Eng, Trond. All Time International Championships: Complete Results, 1889-2002. Askim, Norway: WSSSA-Skøytenytt, 2002.
 Eng, Trond and Magne Teigen. Norske Mesterskap på Skøyter, 1894-2005. Askim/Veggli, Norway: WSSSA-Skøytenytt, 2005.
 Teigen, Magne. Komplette Resultater: Internasjonale Mesterskap, 1889–1989, 1887–1989, menn/kvinner, senior/junior, allround/sprint. Veggli, Norway: WSSSA-Skøytenytt, 1989.
 Teigen, Magne. Komplette Resultater: Norske Mesterskap på Skøyter, 1887–1989, menn/kvinner, senior/junior. Veggli, Norway: WSSSA-Skøytenytt, 1989.
 Teigen, Magne and Preben G. Petersen. Norsk Skøyteleksikon 1988. Veggli, Norway: WSSSA-Norway, 1988.
 Teigen, Magne; Trond Eng, Arild Gjerde, Thorleif Teigen and Preben G. Petersen. Norsk Skøytestatistikk Gjennom Tidene 2004. Askim/Skedsmokorset/Veggli/Hokksund, Norway: WSSSA-Norway, 2004.

External links 
 

1925 births
2011 deaths
People from Øvre Eiker
Norwegian female speed skaters
World record setters in speed skating
World Allround Speed Skating Championships medalists
Sportspeople from Viken (county)